The 2012 Championship 1 was a semi-professional rugby league football competition played in England and Wales, the third tier of the sport in the country. For one season only, the top four teams (Barrow Raiders, Doncaster, Whitehaven and Workington Town) were promoted to the 2013 Rugby Football League Championship, while the champions of the division were decided by a six-team play-off, which was won by Doncaster, who beat Barrow 16–13 at the Halliwell Jones Stadium.

There was no relegation from this league as it is the lowest tier of professional rugby league. All of the teams competed in the 2012 Challenge Cup and the 2012 National League Cup.

2012 structure

The competition featured mainly the same teams as it did in 2011. The exceptions being that the Swinton Lions and the Keighley Cougars were both promoted to compete in the 2012 RFL Championship. The Barrow Raiders were relegated from the 2010 RFL Championship, while the North Wales Crusaders enter the division following the collapse of the Crusaders, who lost a Super League licence for the 2012 season.

Season table

Season results

The regular league season sees the 10 teams play each other twice (one home, one away) over 18 matches. The top six teams at the end of the regular season goes through to the play-offs to determine the winners of Championship 1.

See also
 Co-operative Championship
 2012 RFL Championship
 RFL League 1
 2012 National League Cup

References

External links
Official Championship website
RFL Championship coverage
Scores from Sky Sports
RugbyLeague.org Championship 1 Fans Forums

RFL League 1
Rugby Football League Championship
2012 in English rugby league
2012 in Welsh rugby league